Sitana sivalensis is a species of agamid lizard endemic to Nepal. Its common name is the Siwalik sitana

References

Other references
 Schleich & Kästle, 1998: Sitana fusca spec. nov., a further species from the Sitana sivalensis- complex. Contributions to the herpetology of south-Asia (Nepal, India), Fuhlrott-Museum, Wuppertal, (pp. 207–226).
 Kelaart, Edward Fred 1854 Catalogue of reptiles collected in Ceylon. Ann. Mag. Nat. Hist. (2) 13: 137–140

External links
 

Sitana
Endemic fauna of Nepal
Reptiles of Nepal
Reptiles described in 1998